Heike Fassbender is a German mathematician specializing in numerical linear algebra. She is a professor in the Institute for Computational Mathematics at the Technical University of Braunschweig, and the president for the 2017–2019 term of the Gesellschaft für Angewandte Mathematik und Mechanik (GAMM, the International Association of Applied Mathematics and Mechanics).

Education and career
Fassbender earned a master's degree in computer science at the University at Buffalo, and completed her Ph.D. at the University of Bremen in 1992. Her dissertation, Numerische Verfahren zur diskreten trigonometrischen Polynomapproximation, was jointly supervised by Angelika Bunse-Gerstner and Ludwig F. Elsner.

Fassbender moved to the Technical University of Munich in 2000.
She joined the Technical University of Braunschweig faculty in 2002, 
and was vice president for teaching, studies, and further education at the university from 2008 to 2012.

Book
Fassbender is the author of the book Symplectic Methods for the Symplectic Eigenproblem (Kluwer, 2002).

Professional service
As president of GAMM, Fassbender became the first woman to lead GAMM.
As well as her presidency of GAMM, Fassbender was appointed for a four-year term on the German Accreditation Council in 2018. Moreover, she is treasurer of the International Council for Industrial and Applied Mathematics (ICIAM) is a worldwide organisation for professional applied mathematics societies, and for other societies with a significant interest in industrial or applied mathematics.

References

External links
Home page

Year of birth missing (living people)
Living people
20th-century German mathematicians
Women mathematicians
University at Buffalo alumni
University of Bremen alumni
Academic staff of the Technical University of Munich
Academic staff of the Technical University of Braunschweig
21st-century German mathematicians